Antonio Veneziano (Antonio the Venetian), was an Italian painter who was active mainly in Siena, Florence and Pisa, documented between 1369 and 1419.

He was born apparently in Venice, and was a student of Taddeo Gaddi. In 1384–87, Antonio completed the three Saint Ranieri frescoes begun by Andrea da Firenze in the Campo Santo in Pisa. Already deteriorated by time, they were severely damaged during a bombing raid in World War II. In Pisa, he worked alongside Andrea Vanni on the ceilings of the cathedral in 1370. Antonio painted the ceiling of the Capellone degli Spagnuoli in the Basilica di Santa Maria Novella in Florence. In 1374 he was registered in the Apothecaries' Guild, which included painters, of Florence. He also worked on the church of San Nicolò Reale in Palermo for the Compagnia di SS. Niccolo and Francesco, representing Virgin and St. John in grief (1388). He died in Florence. Gherardo Starnina was Antonio Veneziano's most important student.

References 
 Ghiberti, Lorenzo, Lorenzo Ghiberti, I commentarii, Biblioteca  nazionale centrale di Firenze, Firenze, Giunti, 1998.
 Ladis, Andrew, Antonio Veneziano and the Representation of Emotions, Apollo 124/295 (September 1986), 154–161.
 Vasari, Giorgio, Le Vite delle più eccellenti pittori, scultori, ed architettori, many editions and translations.

14th-century births
15th-century deaths
14th-century Venetian people
14th-century Italian painters
Italian male painters
15th-century Italian painters
Trecento painters
Gothic painters
Painters from Tuscany
Painters from Venice